Coleophora sacramenta is a moth of the family Coleophoridae. It is found in the United States, including California.

The larvae feed on the leaves of Malus, Prunus (including Prunus americana), Populus, Tilia and Chaenomeles species. They create a pistol-shaped case.

References

Sacramenta
Moths described in 1914
Moths of North America